M Goutham Kumar  is an Indian politician who was the 53rd Mayor of Bangalore (Bruhat Bangalore Mahanagara Palike).  He was elected from Jogupalya Ward, belonging to Shanthinagar Assembly Constituency from Bharatiya Janata Party .He got elected as Mayor on 1 October 2019.
While Kumar secured 129 votes, R Satyanarayana from the Congress got 110 votes.
He is also currently the Treasurer of Bharatiya Janata Party, Bengaluru Central Unit.

He had earlier held various posts under BJP's City Unit. He was the Secretary of BJP's Shantinagar Unit for 4 years. He was also the City Secretary of BJP Bengaluru, and in 2013–14 the BBMP Accounts Committee Chairman.

Personal life 
M Goutham Kumar is a member of the Jain community which hails from Siruguppa in Ballari district.

Works and Contributions 
M Goutham Kumar has given a lot of approvals for the house plans through BBMP after the officials have inspected the site and decided to approve it. He also favoured the extension of the mayor’s term from the existing one year to 2.5 years. He also focussed on banning certain types of plastic and tackling the garbage problem.

References 

1976 births
Living people
Mayors of Bangalore
Place of birth missing (living people)
Bharatiya Janata Party politicians from Karnataka